Oliver Kapanen (born 29 July 2003) is a Finnish professional ice hockey centre for KalPa of the Finnish Liiga.

Playing career
Kapanen was drafted in the second round, 64th overall, by the Montreal Canadiens in the 2021 NHL Entry Draft. Kapanen made his professional debut for KalPa during the 2021–22 season.

International play

Kapanen represented Finland at the 2021 IIHF World U18 Championships where he appeared in four games. Kapanen will represent Finland at the 2022 World Junior Ice Hockey Championships.

Personal life
Kapanen comes from a hockey playing family. He is the grandson of former professional hockey player Hannu Kapanen and the son of Kimmo Kapanen.

Career statistics

Regular season and playoffs

International

References

External links
 

2003 births
Living people
Finnish ice hockey centres
Iisalmen Peli-Karhut players
Jokipojat players
KalPa players
Montreal Canadiens draft picks
Oulun Kärpät players
People from Timrå Municipality